Football at the Brunei Merdeka Games, known as Sultan Hassanal Bolkiah Cup, or Brunei Pesta Sukan Cup, was the sports that held during the games which was hosted by Brunei.

There were four editions of the tournament, from 1985 to 1987 and 1990.

Results

References 

 
Merdeka
Brunei Merdeka Games